Louise Elisabeth Peterhoff is a Swedish actress. She trained for ten years as a ballet dancer at the Royal Swedish Ballet.

Peterhoff is of Estonian descent.

Filmography

Films
2019 Midsommar - Hanna
2014 Gentlemen - as Nina Negg 
2013 Den som söker - as Lena
2012 Call Girl - as Ulla
1988 Nånting levande åt Lame-Kal - as Annastina

Television
2018-2021 Det som göms i snö
2016 Gentlemen & Gangsters - as Nina Negg 
2015 The Bridge - as Annika 
2014-15 Blå Ögon - as Elin Hammar. 
2013-14 Äkta människor - as Cloette 
2011 Anno 1790 - as Pauline Martin 
2003 Skeppsholmen - as Natasha 
2002 Spung - as Krista MacCloud

References

External links
Official website

Living people
Swedish film actresses
Swedish television actresses
Swedish people of Estonian descent
20th-century Swedish actresses
21st-century Swedish actresses
1977 births